In the Pond is a 1998 novel by Ha Jin. He has been praised for his works relating to Chinese life and culture.

Overview
The novel centers around the character Shao Bin, a Chinese man working at fertilizer plant, and his struggle to obtain a decent apartment for his young family. Continually passed over by the plant's corrupt leaders, Bin decides to fight back against his communist superiors. Conflict ensues when Bin's struggle is met with counterattacks and opposition he could never have imagined.

Themes
Focusing on the oppressive nature of post Mao-China, a communist society filled with a hierarchy of corruption, and ultimately in an antithetical fashion to Upton Sinclair's novel The Jungle, Ha Jin uses his literary work to convey a central political statement against the injustice of Chinese socialism. Jin stresses the themes of standing up for one's self and not letting the powerful and corrupt destroy one's dreams. The book also contains universal and humanitarian theme of lending a helping hand to aid one's fellow man.

References

1998 American novels
Novels by Ha Jin
Novels set in China